Aşağıçamlı (literally "lower pines" or "below are pine trees") is a Turkish place name that may refer to the following places in Turkey:

 Aşağıçamlı, Bigadiç, a village
 Aşağıçamlı, Bolu, a village in the district of Bolu, Bolu Province
 Aşağıçamlı, Oltu
 Aşağıçamlı, Ulus, a village in the district of Ulus, Bartın Province